Inspector Bediako is a Ghanaian tv series which was aired in the  1990s. It portrayed the character of a young intelligent detective who catches criminals using various investigative methods of which he succeeds no matter the situation. The TV series was loved by Stephanie S. Sullivan. At the time it was on air, it was the only locally produced law enforcement series on television in Ghana.

TV series
Inspector Bediako was launched on 24 March 1993 in Accra by Kojo Yankah who also created the series. He was the director of the Ghana Institute of Journalism until 1993. He was also Member of Parliament for Agona West from January 1993. The first episode entitled "Murder of Bontuku" was aired on 3 April 1993 on GTV. They were 30 minute episodes. This episode highlighted the cooperation necessary between the police and the public in solving crime. This programme filled a void left after Derrick, a crime detection series stopped showing in Ghana.

There has been speculation that the series was due to return in Ghana in 2017. Auditions were done for people interested in playing some of the characters in Accra in March 2017.

Cast
 Oscar Provencal He was the lead actor, Inspector Bediako. 
 Ray Bediako is reported as playing the part of Inspector Bediako in the first episode.
 Akosua Abdallah
 Gloria Nsia Ababio (Dela)
 Martin Owusu (Bentle)
 Teiko

Creator
Kojo Yankah created the series and invited Odie Hawkins to write and direct Inspector Bediako.

Director
The initial writer and director was Odie Hawkins. Jim Fara Awindor wrote and directed six episodes of Inspector Bediako in 1997.

Music
Some of the music for the series was composed by William Anku.

Awards 
Provencal won the best Actor in Comedy (Bigman Wahala) at the Golden Movie Awards Africa.

References

External links
INSPECTOR BEDIAKO Ninovation

Ghanaian television series
1990s Ghanaian television series
1990s crime television series
Television shows set in Ghana
Ghana Broadcasting Corporation original programming